IQ PRO ( Iraqi Professional Players ) موقع المحترفين is a self-financed organisation which was established in 2010. This organisation focuses on scouting of expatriate Iraqi sportspersons and sportspersons of Iraqi origin and presenting them to the Iraqi sports fans and to the Iraqi media and promotes the best out of them to represent the Iraqi National Teams.

The Start

This Project was started by Akam Qader, who is an Iraqi engineer in The USA back in 2010, after a series of bad results of the Iraq national football team. Akam Qader was inspired by the philosophy of the Algerian Football Federation of bringing players of Algerian origins who play in Europe to the Algeria national football team to enhance the quality of the team, which saw them qualify to the FIFA World Cup and perform very well in their games.

Akam with few friends decided to start this project online mainly through the famous Arabic sports website www.kooora.com and through its forum "منتدى كوووره عراقية" (translated: Iraqi Sports Forum). So along with Yousif  Alkhafajy and few more members the search for players of Iraqi origin started.

The Website

The year 2011 saw a new development in this project; the launch of their official old website www.iraqi-players.com.
The website was launched by Yousif Alkhafajy, who then became the C.E.O. founder months later, and it became the first website in Iraq specialised for the database and news of Iraqi expatriate sportspersons and sportspersons of Iraqi origin.

Getting Attention

In 2011, the group collected information about few players of Iraqi origin playing in European Leagues and they delivered the information with photos and videos of the players to the then- Iraq national football team manager Wolfgang Sidka who loved the idea and decided to go to Europe and watch the performance of the players with their clubs. Among those players were David Haidar , Yaser Kasim , Ahmed Yasin Ghani, Osama Rashid, Shwan Jalal , Anmar Almubaraki and Murad Kurdi.

The First Official Callup

In June 2011, the coach Wolfgang Sidka, decided to call few players to the national team for tryouts, and he formed a team which was called "Iraqi European Team" which consisted of Iraqi Expateiate Players and young stars from the Iraqi Premier League and then the Iraqi European team played games against few Iraqi clubs.

In July 2011, Osama Rashid became the first footballer of Iraqi origin to represent Iraq national football team when he came as a second-half substitute in the game against Kuwait national football team in FUCHS Championship. Though Rashid's official papers were not ready, he was allowed to play for the reason that the tournament was a friendly championship.

At the end of 2011, Ahmed Yasin Ghani became the first footballer of Iraqi origin to officially play for Iraq in a FIFA tournament after being called by the Iraqi u23 football team manager Radhi Shenaishil when he represented the Iraqi U23 football team in the game against UAE olympic football team during the 2012 Summer Olympics qualifiers.

In April 2012 with efforts from Iraqi Professional Players and help from Iraq Football Association and after a year of struggle, Osama Rashid's papers were successfully transferred by the FIFA from the Royal Dutch Football Association to the Iraq Football Association as he had previously represented Netherlands up to the u19 level, making Osama the first case of FIFA eligibility transfer in the history of Iraqi Football.

In June 2012, Ahmed Yasin became the first footballer of Iraqi origin to officially represent the Iraq senior football team when he came as a second-half substitute against Lebanon national football team during the Arab Nations Cup held in Saudi Arabia. And later in 2012, he became the first player of Iraqi origin to play for Iraq in a FIFA World Cup Qualification game, followed by Osama Rashid   and David Haider.

Following Years

After their remarkable success in the first 2 years by providing the Iraqi national football team with players like Ahmed Yasin, Osama Rashid and David Haidar, the project starting spreading its wings wider to cover the whole globe with their scouting network.

Though the project was attacked as well as demoralised by many people, but the project kept their hardwork going and by 2014 they were able to discover more than 70 players of Iraqi origin in different parts of the globe and by 2015 they have a database of more than 200 players of Iraqi origin.

Official Recognition by The FA

In 2014, the Iraq Football Association released an official statement, making the Iraqi Professional Players the official and the only database of the Sportspersons of Iraqi origin or the Iraqi expatriate sportspersons.

Making Wider Scouting Network

By 2015, after the success they gained in providing footballers to the Iraqi National Football Teams and the agegroup teams, the project decided to start scouting other in sports, and they were successful to scout talents in sports like Wrestling, Boxing, Weight Lifting, Futsal, Basketball, Swimming, and many other sports.

Awards and Recognitions

2014- Officially recognised by the Iraq Football Association as the only source for database of Iraqi origin sportspersons in the world.

2014- Attaining recognition from AFC

2015- Voted by the fans as the Best Website for The Database and News of Iraqi Professio al Sportspersons in a poll conducted by Iraqi Sports Network.

2015- The Coca-Cola Company becomes the official sponsor of Iraqi Professional Players

References

Sports organizations of Iraq
2010 establishments in Iraq